Polyommatus afghanicus is a butterfly of the family Lycaenidae. It was described by Walter Forster in 1973. It is found in Afghanistan.

References

Butterflies described in 1973
Polyommatus
Butterflies of Asia